Francismar Adriano Dias Garrido (born November 30, 1972) is a male beach volleyball player from Brazil, who won the silver medal in the men's beach team competition at the 1999 Pan American Games in Winnipeg, Manitoba, Canada, partnering Lula Barbosa.

References
 

1972 births
Living people
Brazilian men's beach volleyball players
Beach volleyball players at the 1999 Pan American Games
Pan American Games silver medalists for Brazil
Pan American Games medalists in volleyball
Medalists at the 1999 Pan American Games
Sportspeople from Recife
20th-century Brazilian people